Juan Vitalio Acuña Núñez (1925–1967) was a Cuban politician.

1925 births
1967 deaths
Cuban military personnel
Cuban politicians